Springdale is an unincorporated community in Lafayette County, Mississippi. Springdale is located on the former Illinois Central Railroad. The community was incorporated on February 25, 1875 and disincorporated at an unknown date. A post office operated under the name Spring Dale from 1850 to 1887.

References

Unincorporated communities in Lafayette County, Mississippi
Unincorporated communities in Mississippi